A referendum on amalgamation with Southern Rhodesia was held in Northern Rhodesia in February 1922 alongside Advisory Council elections. The proposal was rejected by 82% of voters, who were generally in favour of the territory becoming a Crown colony with a Legislative Council.

Campaign
Amalgamation was supported by Francis Chaplin, who was Administrator of both Northern and Southern Rhodesia. Opponents included Leopold Moore, a prominent politician and Advisory Council member.

Results

Aftermath
A referendum was held in Southern Rhodesia in October, with voters offered the choices of responsible government or union with South Africa, with 60% voting for the former. In July 1923 the Advisory Council officially requested that Northern Rhodesia be made a Crown colony, and in early 1924 an Order in Council was issued by the British Government, stating that the territory would get a Governor and Legislative Council. Herbert Stanley became the territory's first Governor on 1 April 1924, and a Legislative Council was created in the same year. Its members were initially appointed, until the first elections were held in 1926.

References

1922 in Northern Rhodesia
1922
1922 referendums
1922
1922 elections in the British Empire